Rudolf Albert Scharping (born 2 December 1947) is a German lawyer and politician of the Social Democratic Party (SPD). He was from 1991 to 1994 the 6th Minister President of the State of Rhineland-Palatinate and from 1998 to 2002 Federal Minister of Defence in the government of Chancellor Gerhard Schröder. From 1993 to 1995, Scharping was also the national chairman of the SPD. In the Bundestag election in 1994, he was candidate for chancellor. From March 1995 to May 2001, he served as chairman of the Party of European Socialists (PES).

Early life and education
Scharping was born in Niederelbert. He studied politics, sociology and law at the University of Bonn. His master's thesis was on Social Democratic campaign techniques in Rhineland-Palatinate. He speaks English.

Political career

Career in state politics
Scharping joined the Social Democratic Party of Germany (SPD) in 1966. He was of the Landtag of Rhineland-Palatinate from 1975 to 1994. From 21 May 1991 to 15 October 1994, he served as Minister-President of the state.

Career in national politics
From 1993 to 1995, Scharping was chairman of the SPD, succeeding Björn Engholm. In an internal vote, he won against Gerhard Schröder und Heidemarie Wieczorek-Zeul. At the time, he was the youngest leader in the history of his party. During his time in office, he sought to nudge the party toward the center ground commanded by the Christian Democrats.

In the 1994 elections, Scharping ran as the SPD's candidate for Chancellor against incumbent Helmut Kohl of the Christian Democrats (CDU). By March 1994, he held a 15-point lead over Kohl in the polls. As part of his campaign, he included his long-term rivals Schröder and Oskar Lafontaine in his shadow cabinet. He eventually lost and became leader of the opposition; his successor for the role as Minister-President was Kurt Beck. In his capacity as chairman of the SPD parliamentary group, he also served on the Committee on the Election of Judges (Wahlausschuss), which is in charge of appointing judges to the Federal Constitutional Court of Germany.

Scharping was later defeated by Oskar Lafontaine as SPD chairman in an upset vote at the federal party convent at Mannheim. Instead, he was elected as one of five vice chairmen in the same year and re-elected in 1997, 1999 and 2001.

Minister of Defence, 1998–2002
From 27 October 1998 to 18 July 2002, Scharping served as Germany's Minister of Defence in the government of Chancellor Gerhard Schröder. During his time in office, the German Bundeswehr participated for the first time since 1945 in a War outside Germany in former Yugoslavia. Scharping defended the German involvement with the Hufeisenplan, which later turned out to have likely been a hoax. Parts of the German population doubted the compatibility of the military methods, for example the NATO bombing of Yugoslavia, with the Grundgesetz.

In 1999, Scharping established a government-appointed independent commission headed by former President Richard von Weizsäcker to develop recommendations on the reform of the Bundeswehr.

By July 1999, Scharping was widely considered the leading candidate to become the new Secretary General of NATO; however, he declined to be nominated for the position.

In what was later called Majorca Affair, Scharping had his picture taken in the swimming pool in company of his girlfriend Kristina Countess Pilati while the Bundeswehr was about to begin a difficult mission in Republic of Macedonia. He subsequently faced an investigation in parliament in over claims that he improperly used military planes to visit Pilati in Majorca and in Frankfurt.

Ahead of the 2002 elections, Schröder dismissed Scharping after weekly magazine Stern reported that he had accepted some $71,000 from a Frankfurt public relations company in 1998 and 1999, while he was minister.

Following his dismissal as Minister of Defense, Scharping withdrew his candidacy for reelection as vice chairman as his chances were meagre. His successor was once again Kurt Beck. He kept his Bundestag seat but did not run again in the 2005 elections. For the remainder of his term, he served on the Committee on Foreign Affairs from 2002 until 2015.

Controversy
In 1968, the SPD expelled Scharping for a year for taking part in an antimilitary protest against a fund-raising concert for the German military band.

During a visit to United States Secretary of Defense William Cohen in 2000, Scharping was injured and briefly hospitalized after a steel security barrier sprang up beneath his motorcade as it arrived for an honors ceremony at the Pentagon.

In 2001, Scharping was criticized publicly by Defense Secretary Donald H. Rumsfeld when he was found to be the source of a report that the United States would intervene in Somalia as part of the campaign against terrorism.

Political positions
As chairman of the SPD, Scharping spoke out against the Euro that would leave Germany with a currency weaker than the Deutsche Mark.

Life after politics
Since leaving politics, Scharping established his own company with a focus on business development in China. Scharping is a passionate cyclist; in 2005, he became the chairman of the Bund Deutscher Radfahrer. In addition, he took on a variety of paid and unpaid positions, including as member of the board of trustees at the Bonner Akademie für Forschung und Lehre praktischer Politik (BAPP). He is a Senior Network Member at the European Leadership Network (ELN).

References

External links

 Extensive Biography 
 

1947 births
Living people
People from Westerwaldkreis
Members of the Landtag of Rhineland-Palatinate
Members of the Bundestag 2002–2005
Members of the Bundestag 1998–2002
Members of the Bundestag 1994–1998
Defence ministers of Germany
Presidents of the Party of European Socialists
Members of the Bundestag for Rhineland-Palatinate
University of Bonn alumni
Ministers-President of Rhineland Palatinate
Members of the Bundestag for the Social Democratic Party of Germany